AHNAK nucleoprotein 2 is a protein that in humans is encoded by the AHNAK2 gene.

References

External links 
 PDBe-KB provides an overview of all the structure information available in the PDB for Human Protein AHNAK2